is a 2016 role-playing gacha game developed by UserJoy Technology and published by Nihon Falcom. It is a spin-off of the Trails series, itself a part The Legend of Heroes franchise, and was first released in Japan for browsers. Akatsuki no Kiseki was later ported to Windows, PlayStation Vita, PlayStation 4, Android, iOS, and Nintendo Switch. The PlayStation and Switch versions of the game were discontinued in 2022.

Gameplay
Akatsuki no Kiseki features a mix of role-playing and simulation elements. Portions of the dialogue of major characters are recorded by well-known Japanese voice actors.  did the character artwork. The game features cel-shaded graphics with a battle system resembling the earlier Crossbell arc. Like in other Trails games, combat is turn-based, and the player can move their characters freely on the field of battle. Management of the player's airship also plays a major role in the game.

Plot

Setting
Akatsuki revisits some locations seen in previous Trails games, such as Liberl and Crossbell, while introducing a new cast of characters. The two main protagonists are both bracers, harking back to the original Trails in the Sky games. Additionally, Akatsuki offers players the opportunity to build a party out of characters who appeared in previous Trails games. For example, as part of UserJoy's pre-release promotion campaign, users who pre-registered for an Akatsuki user ID and followed the game's official Twitter account had Noel Seeker, who first appeared in Trails from Zero, added to their party as a bonus character. Players who pre-registered received further bonuses based on the total number of pre-registrations.

Development

Akatsuki no Kiseki was first announced in June 2014 as a project to commemorate the tenth anniversary of the Trails series. Akatsuki was initially scheduled to begin service in 2015. UserJoy Technology opened a preview site for the game in July. Though UserJoy rose to fame mainly for PC MMORPGs such as Angel Love Online and The Legend of Three Kingdoms Online, and later began branching out into mobile games, the early press releases did not clarify the platform for Akatsuki, nor whether it would be purely single-player or if it would have some type of online multi-player functionality.

Falcom president and series producer Toshihiro Kondo revealed a few details about the working relationship between Falcom and UserJoy. He noted that Falcom was collaborating closely with UserJoy on the story, and praised the UserJoy Akatsuki development staff for their knowledge of the Trails series, saying that they were ardent fans who knew details about the games that even Falcom employees themselves did not remember. Kondo went on to state that Falcom might consider producing more online games in the future depending on user response to Akatsuki.

Delay
The two companies remained silent about Akatsuki no Kiseki until December 2015, when Falcom announced that the game had been delayed until 2016. Falcom's press release at the time included the first four screenshots of Akatsuki game play. Userjoy also updated the game's teaser site with information about more characters. Falcom made no further concrete announcements, only a vague statement in April on Twitter and Facebook that operation might begin soon. Mainland Chinese news sites speculated that Akatsuki would be released in the second or third quarter of 2016, while Taiwanese business news reports on UserJoy's Q1 2016 earnings conference in May wrote that Akatsuki would be released in Q4 2016 in Japan and the following year in Taiwan. UserJoy revealed further details at the China Digital Entertainment Expo & Conference in late July, and began tweeting on a dedicated Twitter account for Akatsuki in early August.

On August 9, UserJoy opened the official site for Akatsuki no Kiseki and posted the first promotional video of the game. After a brief open beta test, service began on August 31 as a browser game requiring the Unity Web Player. Falcom subsequently released ports for the PlayStation Vita on December 26 and the PlayStation 3 and PlayStation 4 in 2017. In June 2018, Falcom said that Beijing-based mobile games developer Changyou.com and Shanghai-based video sharing site Bilibili were collaborating to release a Chinese-language adaptation of Akatsuki for smartphones, under the title . A port for the Nintendo Switch was released in Japan as Akatsuki no Kiseki Mobile on August 27, 2019. The PlayStation and Switch versions of the game were removed from digital stores in 2022, with UserJoy offering players the ability to migrate their save data to the mobile versions.

Notes

References

External links
  

Online games
Browser games
iOS games
Android (operating system) games
Role-playing video games
The Legend of Heroes
Trails (series)
Video games developed in Taiwan
2016 video games
PlayStation Vita games
PlayStation 4 games
Nintendo Switch games
UserJoy Technology games